Carlos Germán Belli de La Torre (born September 15, 1927 in Lima) is a Peruvian poet of Italian parentage.

Awards 
He won the Pablo Neruda Ibero-American Poetry Award in 2006, which was granted by Chile's National Council of Culture and the Arts. Belli was nominated for the Nobel Prize in 2007.

Translation 
He translated American, French, Italian and Brazilian poetry into Spanish.

Work 
 Poemas (1958)
 Dentro & fuera (1960)
 Oh Hada Cibernética (1961)
 El pie sobre el cuello. Obra reunida (1967)
 Sextinas y otros poemas (1970)
 En alabanza al bolo alimenticio (1979)
 Boda de pluma y letra (1985)
 Más que señora humana (1986)
 Los talleres del tiempo (1992)
 Salve, spes! (2000)
 En las hospitalarias estrofas (2001)
 La miscelánea íntima (2003)
 El alternado paso de los hados (2006)
 Sextinas villanela y baladas (2007)

Work published in anthologies 
 Ricardo Silva Santisteban (anthologist): Antología general de la traducción en el Perú (General anthology of translation in Peru), volume VI. Lima, Universidad Ricardo Palma - Editorial Universitaria, 2016.

References 

20th-century Peruvian poets
1927 births
Living people
Writers from Lima
National University of San Marcos alumni
Peruvian male poets
International Writing Program alumni
Peruvian translators
20th-century male writers